

Season summary
Hansa finished sixth and qualified for the Intertoto Cup.

First-team squad
Squad at end of season

Left club during season

Competitions

Bundesliga

League table

DFB-Pokal

References

Notes

FC Hansa Rostock seasons
F.C. Hansa Rostock